The Club Deportivo Saquisilí  is a soccer club based in the Saquisilí parish, north of Latacunga in Cotopaxi, Ecuador.

Football clubs in Ecuador
1982 establishments in Ecuador